National Occupational Standards (NOS), also known as professional standards, specify UK standards of performance that people are expected to achieve in their work, and the knowledge and skills they need to perform effectively.

NOS, which are approved by UK government regulators, are available for almost every role in every sector in the UK. For example, there are NOS for: 
 workers in hospitality, leisure, travel & tourism
 care workers
 sports coaches
 museum staff
 probation officers
 those working in environmental conservation
 those working in business and administration.

All approved National Occupational Standards are available for downloading free of charge from the NOS Directory.

Components of NOS

According to the SSDA (the Sector Skills Development Agency, replaced in 2008 by the UK Commission for Employment and Skills and the Federation for Industry Sector Skills and Standards, comprising all nineteen sector skills councils), a unit of NOS must comprise:
 Title, reflecting the content of the NOS
 Overview, an introductory section providing a brief summary of the NOS to help the user judge whether it is relevant to them
 Performance criteria, defining in detail what is expected of the individual
 Knowledge and understanding, what the individual needs to know and/or understand to enable them to meet the performance criteria

NOS may also have sections covering:
 Scope, specifying the range of circumstances or situations that have a critical impact on the activity when carrying out the performance criteria
 Elements. A NOS can be divided into two or more discrete elements which describe the activities the person has to carry out.
 Values and behaviours, the personal attributes an individual is expected to demonstrate within the NOS.

Using NOS

NOS can be used to support any and all human resource management and development activities, as shown in the toolkit developed for Skills for Justice to support the use of the NOS for Legal Advice.

NOS are also used in the UK as the basis for National Vocational Qualifications and Scottish Vocational Qualifications.

Notes

See also

 International Standard Classification of Occupations
 Qualifications and Credit Framework - replacement for National Qualifications Framework, soon to be replaced itself

References

 SSDA, 2007a, Draft Guidance to Sector Skills Councils on Developing, Reviewing and Promoting National Occupational Standards
 SSDA, 2007b, Definition, Description and Explanation of National Occupational Standards

External links
 http://www.insee.fr/fr/ffc/docs_ffc/cse15d.pdf
 NOS Directory
 UK Commission for Employment and Skills

Education in Rotherham
Organisations based in South Yorkshire
Sector Skills Councils
Training
Wath upon Dearne